Max Murray (7 November 1935 – 5 September 2016) was a Scottish footballer.

Career
Murray began his career at Queen's Park, before moving to Ibrox in 1955. His scoring debut came on 13 August 1955 in a Scottish League Cup match against Falkirk which the club won 5–0. He had a very successful spell at Rangers, winning two Scottish league championships and finishing top scorer three times in a row. He amassed 121 goals in just 154 and on 24 October 1956 he scored Rangers' first ever goal in European competition, an equaliser in a European Cup first round match against OGC Nice at Ibrox, a match Rangers won 2–1.

He left Rangers in 1962 for West Bromwich Albion, but he only lasted a season in English football before he moved back to Scotland.

On 5 September 2016, Rangers announced that Murray had died aged 80.

References

1935 births
2016 deaths
Scottish footballers
Camelon Juniors F.C. players
Queen's Park F.C. players
Rangers F.C. players
West Bromwich Albion F.C. players
Clyde F.C. players
Association football forwards
Footballers from Falkirk
Third Lanark A.C. players
Scottish Football League players
English Football League players
Lisburn Distillery F.C. players
Scotland under-23 international footballers
Scotland amateur international footballers